Kao kakao (eng. Like Cocoa) is ninth album of Macedonian rock group Leb i sol. It contains 9 songs. Biggest hits from this album are Mamurni ljudi (Hungover again), Čuvam noć od budnih (Night watchman), Čekam kišu (I'm waiting for the rain)… It was released in 1987 by Jugoton. The album was accompanied by videos for the Mamurni ljudi and Skopje (recorded in Macedonian for the first time).

In 1999, album won Porin Award for Best Reissue. In 2006, Jugoton successor Croatia Records released this album on CD as part of Leb i sol box set.

In January 2023, album was released on 180 gram vinyl. Material is half speed remastered  at Abbey Road Studio in London.

Background 
During 1986, Vlatko Stefanvoski and Bodan Arsovski composed the music for TV show Bušava azbuka (eng. Shaggy alphabet). Bastion member Ana Kostovska performed songs along with them. Goce Micanov and another Bastion member, Kiril Dzajkovski joined the group. Drummer Garabet Tavitijan made comeback in group after 6 years.

By the end of 1987, Pokret magazine described that Vlatko got a hungover again because of being night watchman, adding that the world is like cocoa to him and that the only oasis is Skopje. In the following text, it is said that he met a femme fatale whom he regularly took to FC Vardar matches.

Album 
Album was recorded and mixed in winter 1986/87 in Skopje. For the first time, Vlatko used drum programming. Dzajkovski was in addition to keyboards, for this album he played piano, horn and trumpet. Lyrics for song Femme fatale was written by Arsen Dedic and backing vocals for this song was provided by Bebi Dol.  Vocals in song Autoput was performed by bassist Bodan Arsovski.

Album cover contains Ta Matete by Paul Gauign.

Track listing

Trivia
Cover of 442 issue of magazine Start appears in music video for Mamurni ljudi.
Croatian group Fali V covered Čuvam noć od budnih.

Sound-alikes

 Song Skopje  sampled Walk like an Egyptian by The Bangels. Skopje was sampled in song Soliter by Đorđe Balašević.
 Song Čuvam noć od budnih sampled Careless Whisper by Wham, but also sampled saxophone parts from Narodnjaci by Đorđe Balašević. Čuvam noć od budnih was sampled in Ja za ljubav neću moliti by Nina Badric.
 Title track sampled Izgledala je malo čudno by Bijelo dugme.

References 

1987 albums
Jugoton albums
Leb i sol albums